Huldrefjellet ("the fairy-lady mountain") is a mountain in Oscar II Land at Spitsbergen, Svalbard. The mountain has a height of 725 m.a.s.l. and is located north of Eidembreen, between Huldrebreen and Austgötabreen. Huldrefjellet is part of the Trollheimen range.

References

Mountains of Spitsbergen